Massurrealism is a portmanteau word coined in 1992 by American artist James Seehafer, who described a trend among some postmodern artists that mix the aesthetic styles and themes of surrealism and mass media—including pop art.

History

Massurrealism is a development of surrealism that emphasizes the effect of technology and mass media on contemporary surrealist imagery. James Seehafer who is credited with coining the term in 1992 said that he was prompted to do so because there was no extant definition to accurately characterize the type of work he was doing, which combined elements of surrealism and mass media, the latter consisting of technology and pop art—"a form of technology art." He had begun his work by using a shopping cart, and then incorporating collages of colour photocopies and spray paint  with the artist's traditional medium of oil paint.

In 1995, he assembled a small group show near New York City and found a local cyber-cafe, where he started to post material about massurrealism on internet arts news groups, inspiring some German art students to stage a massurrealist show. The next year he started his own web site, www.massurrealism.com and began to receive work from other artists, both mixed media and digitally-generated. He credits the World Wide Web with a major role in communicating massurrealism, which spread interest from artists in Los Angeles, Mexico and then Europe. Seehafer has said:

The differentiating factor, according to Seehafer, between surrealism and massurrealism is the foundation of the former in the early 20th century in Europe before the spread of electronic mass media. It is difficult to define the visual style of massurrealism, though a general characteristic is the use of modern technology to fuse surrealism's traditional access to the unconscious with pop art's ironic contradictions.

In 2005, graffiti artist Banksy illicitly hung a rock in the British Museum showing a caveman pushing a shopping cart, which Shelley Esaak of about.com described as "a nice tribute to James Seehafer and Massurrealism."

Artists
British artist Alan King started to experiment with a combination of digital and traditional art methods in the 1990s, producing a majority of his works with photography and using computer techniques combines digital images with a multitude of traditional methods including oils, ink, acrylic, and watercolour.

Nationally renowned photographer Chip Simons  incorporates both his photo images with digital collage.

German artist Melanie Marie Kreuzhof, who describes her work as massurrealistic, was commissioned in 2004 by the editor of the Spectakel Salzburger Festsiele Inside magazine to produce an artwork about Erich Wolfgang Korngold's opera Die tote Stadt at the Salzburg Festival. To make her work she took 9 digital photographs, composed them in a computer and printed the result directly onto canvas, which was then attached to a wooden frame, worked on with acrylic paint and had objects attached—3 guitar strings, a strand of hair and a silk scarf. The images and elements were derived from themes in the opera. 

Other artists include Cecil Touchon who works with sound collage & poetry, and conceptual artist / film set designer Jean Pierre Trevor describes his 'massurreal approach' to his multi-media work. 

American Southern artist John R. Adams / Johnny Ramage's  work consists of digital media, photography, and random Google images chosen through an automatic style and rendered in unsophisticated photo editing software. Ramage's work often focuses on ominous, absurd images inspired by frightening childhood events all depicted in style that suggests a low-fi, or 8-bit and contemporary aesthetic.

See also
Metaphysical art

Notes and references

Further reading
 Andreja Velimirović, "90s Art and Its Bequest to Contemporary Art" Widewalls
 Dallas Simms, "The Digital Psyche: Disembodied Embodiment, Massurrealism and Social Media" University Of Virginia, Charlottesville
 Seehafer, James / Morris, Michael / Kocsis, Phillip (2013). Three Essays About Massurrealism. Princeton: University Plaza Press. .
 Lantzen, Sean (2004). Massurrealism: A Dossier (a.k.a. Massurrealismus: Ein Dossier). Zurich: Novus Haus. .
 Ese Atakpu, "7 Art Styles" Kurating.com Retrieved 20 August 2019. Archived at the Wayback Machine

 University of Birmingham, Burmingham, UK TURING ARTS SYMPOSIUM 2012 with the AISB/IACAP WORLD CONGRESS - discussion and visualizations of man/machine similarities and differences in select art works of surrealism e.g. Matta 1938 and Massurrealism of the 21st century.
 "The Inevitability Of Massurrealism" - Mark Daniel Cohen Wegway No:7 page 52 (Printed edition - Toronto Canada) November, 2004.
 "Avant Garde Under Net Conditions" - Perspektive (Printed edition - Austria) German text only.available online Retrieved June 2000.
 "What is new In The Surreal World" - Art and Antiques Magazine, (USA) March 2006.
 Celia Fernández, Contemplando el Massurrealismo Contemplating Massurrealism, Instituto Superior de Danza Alicia Alonso de La Universidad Rey Juan Carlos, Mardrid, Spain - text in both Spanish and English
 "Massurrealism Yields New Unique Vision" - Computer Artist   . (USA) August/September 1996
 Brunner, Dr. Cornelia & Tally, William (1999). The new media literacy handbook. Anchor Books .
 Hoffman, Barry Howard (2002). The fine art of advertising: irreverent, irrepressible, irresistibly, ironic. Stewart, Tabori & Chang. Original from the University of Michigan
 Touchon, Cecil (2007). Happy Shopping - Massurrealist Spam Poetry. Fort Worth: Ontological Museum Publications. .
 King, Alan (2009). A Room Of Illusions - the Massurreal & Illusionary art of Alan King. Fort Worth: Ontological Museum Publications.  ASIN: 0615263054

External links
Massurrealism - Urban Art Minute brief overview of the influences and origins (Art Media Journal)
Three Essays About Massurrealism audiobook version released in 2013. Narrated by Grover Gardner, 35 minutes
The Museum For Massurrealist Art homepage

Visual arts genres
Contemporary art
Digital art
Postmodernism
Western art